Turkey competed at the 1992 Summer Olympics in Barcelona, Spain.

Medalists

Competitors
The following is the list of number of competitors in the Games.

Results by event

Archery
In its third Olympic archery competition, Turkey's women were much more successful than the men.  The ladies were able to earn a top eight finish in the team round.

Women's Individual Competition:
 Natalia Nasaridze — Round of 16, 15th place (1-1)
 Zehra Oktem — Round of 32, 30th place (0-1)
 Elif Eksi — Ranking round, 39th place (0-0)

Men's Individual Competition:
 Kerem Ersu — Ranking round, 46th place (0-0)
 Vedat Erbay — Ranking round, 50th place (0-0)
 Ozcan Ediz — Ranking round, 59th place (0-0)

Women's Team Competition:
 Nasaridze, Oktem, and Eksi — Quarterfinal, 6th place (1-1)

Men's Team Competition:
 Ersu, Erbay, and Ediz — Ranking round, 18th place

Athletics
 Zeki Öztürk
 Alper Kasapoğlu

Boxing
 Mehmet Gürgen

Judo

Men's Competition
 Haldun Efemgül (– 69 kg)
 Alpaslan Ayan (– 71 kg)

Women's Competition
 Hülya Şenyurt (– 48 kg)
 Derya Çalışkan (– 52 kg)

Sailing
Men's Sailboard (Lechner A-390)
 Kutlu Torunlar
 Final Ranking — 310.0 points (→ 32nd place)

Swimming
Men's 100m Freestyle
 Mehmet Uğur Taner
 Heat — 51.34 (→ did not advance, 27th place)

Men's 200m Freestyle
 Mehmet Uğur Taner
 Heat — 1:50.95 (→ did not advance, 20th place)

Men's 400m Freestyle
 Mehmet Uğur Taner
 Heat — 3:57.64 (→ did not advance, 23rd place)
 Can Ergenekan
 Heat — 3:58.43 (→ did not advance, 25th place)

Men's 100m Backstroke
 Derya Büyükuncu
 Heat — 57.38 (→ did not advance, 22nd place)

Men's 200m Backstroke
 Derya Büyükuncu
 Heat — 2:06.01 (→ did not advance, 33rd place)

Men's 100m Butterfly
 Mehmet Uğur Taner
 Heat — 55.31 (→ did not advance, 24th place)
 Can Ergenekan
 Heat — 56.30 (→ did not advance, 38th place)

Men's 200m Butterfly
 Can Ergenekan
 Heat — 2:00.82
 B-Final – 2:01.21 (→ 12th place)
 Mehmet Uğur Taner
 Heat — 2:01.61 (→ did not advance, 23rd place)

Taekwondo
 Ekrem Boyali
 Ali Şahin
 Metin Şahin
 Arzu Tan
 Ayşegül Ergin
 Abbe Kivrik

Weightlifting
 Halil Mutlu (– 52 kg)
 Hafız Süleymanoğlu (– 56 kg)
 Naim Süleymanoğlu (– 60 kg)
 Muharrem Süleymanoğlu (– 75 kg)
 Sunay Bulut (– 82,5 kg)
 Erdinç Aslan (– 110 kg)

Wrestling

Freestyle
 Ahmet Orel (– 52 kg)
 Remzi Musaoğlu (– 57 kg)
 Ismail Faikoğlu (– 62 kg)
 Fatih Özbaş (– 68 kg)
 Selahattin Yiğit (– 74 kg)
 Sebahattin Öztürk (– 82 kg)
 Kenana Şimşek (– 90 kg)
 Ali Kayali (– 100 kg)
 Mahmut Demir (– 130 kg)

Greco-Roman
 Ömer Elmas (– 48 kg)
 Remzi Öztürk (– 52 kg)
 Ergüder Bekişdamat (– 57 kg)
 Mehmet Akif Pirim (– 62 kg)
 Erhan Balci (– 74 kg)
 Hakkı Başar (– 90 kg)

References

Nations at the 1992 Summer Olympics
1992
1992 in Turkish sport